"What a Way to Go" is a song written by Bobby David and Jim Rushing. It was originally recorded by Bobby Borchers in 1977 on Playboy Records.

It was later recorded by American country music artist Ray Kennedy, who released it in November 1990 as the first single and title track from his debut album What a Way to Go. The song reached No. 10 on the Billboard Hot Country Singles & Tracks chart in February 1991. Kennedy's version featured an altered verse from the original.

Chart performance

Bobby Borchers

Ray Kennedy

Year-end charts

References

1977 singles
1990 debut singles
Bobby Borchers songs
Ray Kennedy songs
Atlantic Records singles
Songs written by Jim Rushing